The Hustle (2004) is the first solo studio album released by G. Love and sixth overall studio release including all G. Love and Special Sauce studio albums.

Track listing
"Astronaut" – 3:23
"Don't Drop It!" – 2:45
"Love" – 3:39
"Booty Call" – 3:25
"Give It to You (feat. Jack Johnson)" – 3:24
"The Hustle" – 3:21
"Front Porch Lounger" – 3:59
"Loving Me" – 3:21
"Waiting" – 3:19
"Fishing Song" – 2:46
"The Back of the Bus" – 3:32
"Two Birds" – 2:08
"Stone Me" – 4:24
"Sunshine" – 2:07

iTunes re-released The Hustle with 4 iTunes only Bonus Tracks, They Are:

15. "Kickin' Back" - 4:24
16. "Amy" - 2:17
17. "Ain't That Right" - 3:48
18. "Windshield Wiper, No. 1" - 4:01

All The Players
G. Love - vocals, guitar, harp

Special Sauce
Jimi "Jazz" Prescott - string bass
Jeffrey "Houseman" Clemens - drums, vocals

Special Guests
Jack Johnson - acoustic guitar and vocals on "Give It To You" and "Stone Me"
Chuck Treece - various instruments and vocals
Money Mark - keyboards
Jason Yates - Hammond organ
Danny Frankel - percussion
Koool G. Murder - keyboards
Pete Kuzma - piano

Charts

References

External links
G. Love & Special Sauce Official site

G. Love & Special Sauce albums
2004 debut albums
albums produced by Mario Caldato Jr.